Claytor is a surname. Notable people with the surname include:

Gertrude Harris Boatwright Claytor (1888–1973), American poet
Robert B. Claytor (1922–1993), American railroad administrator
W. Graham Claytor (1886–1971), of Roanoke, Virginia, vice president of Appalachian Power Company, an electric utility service
W. Graham Claytor Jr. (1912–1994), American lawyer, naval officer, and railroad, transportation and defense administrator for the US government
William Schieffelin Claytor (1908–1967), third African-American to get a PhD in mathematics

See also
Claytor Lake, 21 mile long reservoir in Pulaski County, Virginia on the New River created for a hydroelectric project of Appalachian Power Company
Claytor Lake State Park in Pulaski County, Virginia is located on Claytor Lake
Miller–Claytor House, historic home located at Riverside Park in Lynchburg, Virginia

de:Claytor